Dehqanan Rural District is a rural district (dehestan) in the Central District of Kharameh County, Fars Province, Iran. At the 2006 census, its population was 7,614, in 1,888 families.  The rural district has 13 villages.

References 

Rural Districts of Fars Province
Kharameh County